Pré-Saint-Didier is a town and comune in the Aosta Valley region of north-western Italy, at  above sea level.

Transportation
The terminus of the regional railway is located there, although with no services since 2015. Before closure there were direct trains connecting the town to Aosta, which is connected to the rest of the Italian network. Regular bus connection to places located further up the mountains (La Thuile, Courmayeur) is available.

External links
 Pré-Saint-Didier thermal baths - Official website

Cities and towns in Aosta Valley
Spa towns in Italy